I Love You, Goodbye is a 2009 Filipino film starring Gabby Concepcion, Angelica Panganiban, Derek Ramsay and Kim Chiu. It is produced and released by Star Cinema. It is also the official entry of Star Cinema to the 35th Metro Manila Film Festival.

The film was also shown in select cities in the United States in January 2010 via ABS-CBN International.

Story 
Lizelle Jimenez (Angelica Panganiban) is in a new relationship with Surgeon Adrian Benitez (Gabby Concepcion).

Everything appears to be going well until Adrian's daughter from a previous marriage, Ysa (Kim Chiu), arrives from abroad and lives with them. Ysa, spares no time in showing her dislike for Lizelle, unbeknownst to Adrian.

Adrian is sued for malpractice and the investigation start to cause conflict in Adrian and Lizelle's relationship.

Feeling unwanted Lizelle finds comfort in the seductive photographer Gary Angeles (Derek Ramsay) whom we discover early on as the ex-boyfriend of Lizelle (of four years), but is now dating Ysa.

Lizelle and Gary rekindled their romance, with the latter admitting that he dated Ysa to get back with Lizelle. Ysa tried to win Gary's heart but Gary admitted that he loved someone else.

Lizelle and Gary decided to run away together, but Lizelle was stood up. Lizelle went back to Adrian and asked to be married to him. They were in the midst of the wedding preparation when a lawyer sought Lizelle out, stating that Lizelle is the sole beneficiary of Gary, and was shown a death certificate. Adrian went home to Lizelle crying on the sofa, admitting she tried to leave him for Gary, but he didn't show up. Then she presented him the death certificate stating he knows Gary died because he is listed as the first responder.

Adrian recounted his story, he admitted to Lizelle that he knows she is meeting Gary that day and is leaving him. He went to Gary stating he won't give her without a fight, while arguing, Gary tried to cross the road but got struck by a car. He was dead on arrival.

Lizelle asked for forgiveness. They resolved their problems and decided to continue with the marriage. Lizelle was then shown laying flowers down at Gary's tomb before walking away hand in hand with Adrian.

Cast and characters

Main cast 

Gabby Concepcion as Adrian Benitez
Angelica Panganiban as Lizelle Jimenez
Derek Ramsay as Gary Angeles
Kim Chiu as Ysa Benitez

Supporting cast
Angel Aquino as Valerie Benitez
Joem Bascon as Raul
Matet de Leon as Melai	
Ketchup Eusebio as Jimbo	
Janna Dominguez as Connie		
Liza Lorena as Melinda
Arlene Muhlach as Claire
Ces Quesada as Manang
Cris Villanueva as Arthur
Chinggoy Alonzo† as Dr. Eduardo Vicencio

Reception

Gross
I Love You Goodbye grossed a total of ₱94.2 million as of January 7, 2010, where the film fest officially closed. It took the second spot in terms of box-office performance. The film came right after Ang Panday, which grossed ₱99.4 million. And as of January 15, 2010, the film had grossed ₱108 million, according to the statement released by Star Cinema. It became one of the most successful romantic-drama movies from Star Cinema.

Feedbacks
The movie received positive feedback. Angelica Panganiban's acting was excellent as expected by many. Kim Chiu's performance was subtle as the villain. Her character brought about the movie's conflict. Both actresses received positive reviews on their performance.

Awards and nominations

References

External links
 
 

2009 films
2000s Tagalog-language films
Star Cinema films
Philippine romance films
Films directed by Laurice Guillen